Gregory Daniel Pirkl (born August 7, 1970), is an American former professional baseball player.

External links

1970 births
Living people
American expatriate baseball players in Canada
American expatriate baseball players in Japan
Baseball players from Long Beach, California
Bellingham Mariners players
Boston Red Sox players
Calgary Cannons players
Columbus RedStixx players
Fukuoka Daiei Hawks players
Jacksonville Suns players
Kinston Indians players
Major League Baseball designated hitters
Major League Baseball first basemen
Nippon Professional Baseball designated hitters
Peninsula Pilots players
Seattle Mariners players
San Bernardino Spirit players
Tacoma Rainiers players